Belodol is a village in the municipality of Pomorie, in Burgas Province, in southeastern Bulgaria. As of 2013, it had a population of 460.

References

Villages in Burgas Province